Pentodon is a genus of beetles belonging to the subfamily Dynastinae, species of which include:

Pentodon algerinus (Fuessly 1788)
Pentodon bidens (Pallas 1771)
Pentodon idiota (Herbst 1789)
Pentodon quadridens (Gebler 1844)
Pentodon variolopunctatus (Fairmaire 1879)

References

Dynastinae